The women's team sprint freestyle cross-country skiing competition at the 2018 Winter Olympics was held on 21 February 2018 at 19:00 KST at the Alpensia Cross-Country Skiing Centre in Pyeongchang, South Korea. The event consisted of 6 by 1.25km sprints alternating between 2 teammates. Kikkan Randall and Jessie Diggins won the event, making this the first ever Olympic medal for the United States in women's cross-country skiing. It was also the first ever Olympic gold medal for the United States in cross-country skiing. Charlotte Kalla and Stina Nilsson came second, and the defending champion Marit Bjørgen, skiing in pair with Maiken Caspersen Falla, won the bronze medal.

Qualification

A total of up to 310 cross-country skiers qualified across all eleven events. Athletes qualified for this event by having met the A qualification standard, which meant having 100 or less FIS Points The Points list takes into average the best results of athletes per discipline during the qualification period (1 July 2016 to 21 January 2018). Countries received additional quotas by having athletes ranked in the top 30 of the FIS Olympics Points list (two per gender maximum, overall across all events). Countries also received an additional quota (one per gender maximum) if an athlete was ranked in the top 300 of the FIS Olympics Points list. After the distribution of B standard quotas, the remaining quotas were distributed using the Olympic FIS Points list, with each athlete only counting once for qualification purposes. A country could only enter a maximum of one team for the sprint consisting of two athletes.

Results
 Q — qualified for next round
 LL — lucky loser
 PF — photo finish

Semifinals

Final
The final started at 19:00.

References

Women's cross-country skiing at the 2018 Winter Olympics
Women's team sprint cross-country skiing at the Winter Olympics